Yeshiva of Cleveland is an Orthodox yeshiva in Cleveland Heights, Ohio. An affiliate of Yeshiva Chofetz Chaim, it was founded in 2017 by Dovid Davidowitz and Avrohom Fertig.

References

Educational institutions established in 2017
Mesivtas
Religious organizations established in 2017
Orthodox yeshivas in the United States
Jewish organizations established in the 2010s
2017 establishments in Ohio